A whisky Macdonald, more commonly known under the shortened name whisky Mac, is a cocktail made up of whisky and ginger wine. The whisky is expected to be a Scotch whisky, usually a blended type. The ginger wine should be green ginger wine. Recipes vary from those having equal parts of each ingredient to those that use a ratio of 3 to 2 of whisky to wine.

A common recipe is to take  Scotch whisky and  green ginger wine. Pour both of the ingredients into a wine goblet with no ice. A hot version can also be made, akin to a hot toddy, made with the addition of boiling water.

The invention of it, and its name, is attributed to Colonel Hector MacDonald, who devised it during the days of the British Raj in India. The mixed drink is sometimes referred to as "The Golfers' Favourite". Apparently, golfers drank whisky macs to ward off the cold after a chilly round on the links.

It was famously the favourite drink of Rosaleen Norton who preferred it with the addition of dry ginger ale.

See also

 List of cocktails

References

Cocktails with Scotch whisky
Cocktails with wine